Covelo is a municipality in Galicia, Spain, in the province of Pontevedra.

References

Municipalities in the Province of Pontevedra